Carlos Patricio Galdames Vásquez (born 1 March 1980) is a Chilean football coach and former player who played as a forward. He is the current manager of Unión La Calera's youth sides.

Honours

Player
Provincial Osorno
 Primera B: 2007

References
 
 

1980 births
Living people
Chilean footballers
Unión La Calera footballers
Unión San Felipe footballers
Magallanes footballers
Provincial Osorno footballers
San Luis de Quillota footballers
Chilean Primera División players
Primera B de Chile players
Association football forwards
Chilean football managers
Unión La Calera managers
People from Osorno, Chile